The Lola T92/50 is an open-wheel formula race car chassis developed by British manufacturer Lola, for use in various international Formula 3000 championships, in 1992. The car was eventually converted into a prototype-style chassis, and used in open rules championships like Interserie.

References 

Open wheel racing cars
International Formula 3000
Lola racing cars